Alfred Louis Shaw (May 22, 1873 – March 25, 1958), nicknamed "Shoddy", was an English born Major League Baseball catcher who played four seasons with the Detroit Tigers (1901), Boston Americans (1907), Chicago White Sox (1908), and Boston Doves (1909).

Shaw was born in Burslem in the English county of Staffordshire, and made his Major League debut at age 28 with the Tigers. He hit .269 with a .321 on-base percentage in 55 games in 1901 with 20 runs and 23 RBIs for the Tigers. Shaw did not play again in the Major Leagues for six years, when he signed with the Boston Americans in 1907. In 76 games for Boston, Shaw hit only .192. His batting average continued to decline in 1908 (.082) and 1909 (.098), and he played his last Major League game for the Doves on September 13, 1909.

In March 1958, Shaw died in Uhrichsville, Ohio, at age 84.

References

External links

1873 births
1958 deaths
Major League Baseball catchers
Detroit Tigers players
Boston Americans players
Chicago White Sox players
Boston Doves players
English baseball players
Major League Baseball players from the United Kingdom
Major League Baseball players from England
Twin Cities Twins players
Twin Cities Hustlers players
Wheeling Nailers (baseball) players
Syracuse Stars (minor league baseball) players
Detroit Tigers (Western League) players
Dayton Old Soldiers players
Marion Glass Blowers players
Buffalo Bisons (minor league) players
Louisville Colonels (minor league) players
Indianapolis Indians players
Wichita Jobbers players
Pueblo Indians players
Des Moines Boosters players
People from Uhrichsville, Ohio
British emigrants to the United States